The Puducherry–Mangalore Central Weekly Express is an Express train belonging to Southern Railway zone that runs between  and  in India. It is currently being operated with 16855/16856 train numbers on a weekly basis.

Service

The 16855/Puducherry–Mangaluru Central Weekly Express has an average speed of 47 km/hr and covers 798 km in 16h 55m. The 16856/Mangaluru Central–Puducherry Weekly Express has an average speed of 47 km/hr and covers 798 km in 16h 55m.

Halts & Schedule
The train 16855 leaves Puducherry (Pondicherry – PDY ) at 16:35 on Thursday and reaches Mangalore at 10:00 on Friday. It returns as 16856 which leaves Mangaluru (Mangalore Central) at 17:05 on Friday and reaches Puducherry (Pondicherry) at 10:00 on Saturday.

16856 MAQ–PDY WEEKLY EXP. (FRIDAY)

16855 PDY–MAQ WEEKLY EXP. (THURSDAY)

Coach composition

The train has standard ICF rakes with a max speed of 110 kmph. The train consists of 15 coaches:

 1 AC II Tier
 2 AC III Tier
 7 Sleeper coaches
 6 General Unreserved
 2 Seating cum Luggage Rake

Traction

Both trains are hauled by a Golden Rock Loco Shed-based WDM-3A diesel locomotive from Puducherry to Mangalore and vice versa.

Rake sharing

22604–22603–22606–22605 – Empty to PDY – 16855–16856–16857–16858 – Empty to VM and repeat. PM @VM and SM @ MAQ. Total 2 standard blue ICF rakes

Direction reversal

The train reverses its direction 1 times:

See also 

 Puducherry railway station
 Mangaluru Central railway station
 Puducherry–Mangalore Central Express (via Tiruchirappalli)
 Tirur railway station

Notes

References

External links 

 16855/Puducherry–Mangaluru Central Weekly Express India Rail Info
 16856/Mangaluru Central–Puducherry Weekly Express India Rail Info

Transport in Puducherry
Transport in Mangalore
Express trains in India
Rail transport in Puducherry
Rail transport in Tamil Nadu
Rail transport in Kerala
Rail transport in Karnataka